The Ahmadiyya Muslim Community was established in United Kingdom with the pioneering efforts of Chaudhry Fateh Muhammad Sial, who arrived in London in July in 1913. Sial was the first missionary sent overseas by the Ahmadiyya Muslim Community and was under the direction of Hakeem Noor-ud-Din, the first caliph of the movement.

History 
Not many years after arriving, the need for a mosque in the UK became apparent and in 1926, the Fazl Mosque was formally opened in London and it became the city's first mosque. The community expanded and built many mosques and mission houses across the country. The most notable of which is Baitul Futuh Mosque in South London stands as one of the largest in Western Europe.

International Headquarters 
The International Headquarters of the Ahmadiyya Muslim Community is in United Kingdom since 1984. Since the forced exile of the fourth caliph of the community, Mirza Tahir Ahmad from Pakistan in 1984, the Fazl Mosque, London served as International Headquarters for a period of 35 years before moving the International Headquarters to Islamabad, Tilford on 15 April 2019.

Demographics 
As of 2017, there are 30,000 Ahmadis in the UK in 150 local chapters.

Notable Ahmadi Residents of United Kingdom 
Mirza Masroor Ahmad – Fifth Caliph and current leader of the worldwide Ahmadiyya Muslim Community

Mirza Tahir Ahmad – Fourth Caliph during his time the Community's headquarters moved to United Kingdom from Pakistan.

Dr. Abdus Salam - First Muslim Nobel Laureate and A devoted member of the community, lived in Putney, London

Tariq Ahmad, Baron Ahmad of Wimbledon – Member of the House of Lords, UK, Minister of State for the Commonwealth and South Asia and Prime Minister’s Special Representative on Preventing Sexual Violence in Conflict

Iftikhar A. Ayaz – Tuvaluan Consular Official, UK

Cllr Iftikhar Chaudhri – Mayor of Runnymede

Abdul Rahim Dard – writer, missionary, Imam of the historic Fazl Mosque and political activist for the Pakistan Movement

Fateh Muhammad Sial – the first Ahmadi missionary sent overseas by Ahmadiyya Muslim Community

Bashir Ahmad Orchard – first Missionary of the Ahmadiyya Muslim Community of European descent

Anti-Ahmadiyya Campaign 

The movement suffers from Sunni bigotry in the UK. They are not recognised as Muslims by the Muslim Council of Britain and are targets for vilification by the Khatme Nubuwwat Academy.

Ahmadiyya Places of worship 
There are in total 25 Ahmadiyya worship places in whole UK.

• Fazl Mosque (Built in 1926) 

• Baitul Hamd (Built in 1980)

• Bait Ur Rahman (Built in 1984 )

• Baitul Futuh (Built in 2003)

• Darul Barakaat (Built in 2004)

• Nasir Mosque (Built in 2005)

• Baitul Ahad (Built in 2008)

• Al Mahdi (Built in 2008)

• Baitul Afiyat (Built in 2008)

• Baitul Tauhid (Built in 2008)

• Baitul Ehsan (Built in 2008)

• Tahir Mosque (Built in 2012)

• Baitul Wahid (Built in 2012)

• Baitul Aman (Built in 2012 )

• Baitul Atta (Built in 2012 )

• Baitul Ghafoor (Built in 2012)

• Darul Aman (Built in 2012)

• Jamia Ahmadiyya UK (Built in 2012)

• Noor Mosque (Built in 2014)

• Nasir Mosque (Built in 2014)

• Baitul Ikram (Built in 2016)

• Baitul Ehsan (Built in 2017)

• Baitul Muqeet (Built in 2018)

• Baitul Hafeez (Built in 2018)

• Mubarak Mosque (Built in 2019) 

• Darus Salam (Build in 2020)

References

United Kingdom
Islam in the United Kingdom